John Doherty may refer to:

Sportspeople
John Doherty (boxer) (born 1962), British boxer
John Doherty (first baseman) (born 1951), first baseman for the Angels
John Doherty (English footballer) (1935–2007), English footballer
John Doherty (Irish footballer) (born 1908), Irish footballer
John Doherty (pitcher) (born 1967), pitcher for the Tigers and Red Sox
John Doherty (runner) (born 1961), English-born long-distance runner for Ireland
John Joe Doherty, Irish sportsperson
Ken Doherty (track and field) (John Kenneth Doherty, 1905–1996), American decathlete

Others
John Doherty (ABC) (died 2004), senior executive in the Australian Broadcasting Corporation
John Doherty (chef) (born 1958), American chef
John Doherty (musician) (1900–1980), Irish fiddler
John Doherty (Irish politician) (1785–1850), Solicitor-General for Ireland
John Doherty (New York politician) (1826–1859), New York politician
John Doherty (trade unionist) (1798–1854), UK trade unionist
John Joseph Doherty (1919–1942), United States Navy officer awarded the Distinguished Flying Cross

See also
John Dougherty (disambiguation)
John Docherty (disambiguation)
Jack Daugherty (disambiguation)
Jack Doherty (disambiguation)